Benjamin Christopher Flores Jr. (born July 24, 2002), also known as Lil' P-Nut, is an American child actor and rapper. In music, he is known for his song "You Might Be the One". In acting, Flores starred as Louie Preston on the Nickelodeon television series The Haunted Hathaways (2013–2015), and as Triple G on the Nickelodeon series Game Shakers (2015–2019).

Career

Music
Flores was born in Memphis, Tennessee. Flores first came to wider notice  after he was interviewed by the local Memphis Fox 13 television station at age 7. After that interview, he appeared on The Ellen DeGeneres Show, where he performed his first rap single as Lil' P-Nut, "You Might Be the One for Me"; it was released on September 25, 2010.  He then appeared on Cymphonique's song, "All That". His other raps include "Bad Dream" and "Choosin'".

Acting
Flores appeared in an episode of the TBS sitcom Are We There Yet?, and played Atticus the rapping penguin in the animated film Happy Feet 2, in 2011. He made a cameo appearance in Yo Gotti's music video for "Look In The Mirror". Flores appeared in the film Ride Along, which was released in January 2014.

In 2013 Flores was cast in a starring role on the Nickelodeon television series The Haunted Hathaways, playing Louie a young ghost that resides in the same house with a living family called the Hathaways. The show ran two seasons before ending in 2015. He was nominated for Favorite TV Actor at the Nickelodeon Kids' Choice Awards in 2014 and 2015 for his role on The Haunted Hathaways.

On July 7, 2015, it was announced that Flores would be co-starring in Dan Schneider's newest TV series, Game Shakers, playing the role of Triple G, the son of famous rapper Double G (Kel Mitchell). The series was renewed for a third season in November 2016.

On June 13, 2016, Flores was announced as the new voice of Gerald Johanssen in the television movie Hey Arnold!: The Jungle Movie. In 2017, he had a role in the fantasy-action film Transformers: The Last Knight. In 2018 Flores was cast in the Netflix film Rim of the World, which was released in May 2019. In 2021, he starred as Josh in The Fear Street Trilogy, beginning with Fear Street Part One: 1994; the films were released on Netflix. From 2020 to 2021, he also played Eugene Jones in the Showtime television series Your Honor.

Filmography

Awards and nominations

References

External links
 
 
 

2002 births
African-American musicians
American child musicians
American male child actors
American male television actors
Living people
21st-century African-American people